Jan Czepulkowski (17 July 1930 – 26 January 2016) was a Belarusian-born Polish male weightlifter, who competed in the lightweight class and represented Poland at international competitions. He won the bronze medal at the 1957 World Weightlifting Championships in the 67.5 kg category. He participated at the 1956 Summer Olympics in the Men's Lightweight event. Czepułkowski had furthermore the following podium finishes at major championships: 3rd in the 1956 European Championships Middleweight class (362.5 kg); 2nd in the 1957 European Championships Lightweight class (352.5 kg) and 3rd in the 1959 European Championships Lightweight class (360.0 kg).

References

External links
 

1930 births
2016 deaths
Polish male weightlifters
World Weightlifting Championships medalists
People from Maladzyechna
People from Wilno Voivodeship (1926–1939)
Olympic weightlifters of Poland
Weightlifters at the 1956 Summer Olympics